CSKFTA or CKFTA can refer to:
Canada–South Korea Free Trade Agreement (also known as the Canada–Korea Free Trade Agreement)
China–South Korea Free Trade Agreement (also known as the China–Korea Free Trade Agreement)